Josefa Villalabeitia Ford (born 12 October 1990) is a Chilean field hockey player.

Villalabeitia has represented Chile at both junior and senior levels. She made her junior debut at the 2008 Pan-Am Junior Championship, and her senior debut at the 2013 South American Championship in Santiago.

Villalabeitia has represented Chile at two South American Games, in Santiago 2014 and Cochabamba 2018. The team medalled at both evens, winning silver in 2014 and bronze in 2018.

Villalabeitia was a member of the Chile team at the 2017 Pan American Cup. The team won a silver medal, after a historic semi-final victory over the United States progressed the team to the final. The team ultimately lost to Argentina 4–1 in the final.

References

1990 births
Living people
Chilean female field hockey players
South American Games silver medalists for Chile
South American Games bronze medalists for Chile
South American Games medalists in field hockey
Competitors at the 2014 South American Games
Competitors at the 2018 South American Games
Pan American Games competitors for Chile
Field hockey players at the 2019 Pan American Games
20th-century Chilean women
21st-century Chilean women